Lin Yu-lin (6 October 1936 – 9 June 2018) was a Taiwanese billionaire real estate developer, brother of fellow billionaire and politician Lin Rong-San.

Biography
Lin Yu-lin was born in 1936. He was a real estate mogul, owner of the commercial property Hung Tai Center, and a major investor in the construction companies Hung Sheng Construction, Cooperative Construction and Hung Tai Asset Management. He was also a key shareholder in En Tie Commercial Bank. He owned the office and retail complexes Exchange Square I and II in Taipei.

According to Forbes, Lin had a net worth of $5.7 billion in January 2015.

He was married with seven children and lived in Taipei. He died on 9 June 2018 at the age of 81.

References

External links 
 Official website

1936 births
2018 deaths
20th-century Taiwanese businesspeople
Taiwanese billionaires
Taiwanese people of Hoklo descent
Businesspeople from New Taipei
21st-century Taiwanese businesspeople